Ilex aquifolium, the holly, common holly, English holly, European holly, or occasionally Christmas holly, is a species of flowering plant in the family Aquifoliaceae, native to western and southern Europe, northwest Africa, and southwest Asia. It is regarded as the type species of the genus Ilex, which by association is also called "holly". It is an evergreen tree or shrub found, for example, in shady areas of forests of oak and in beech hedges. In the British Isles it is one of very few native hardwood evergreen trees. It has a great capacity to adapt to different conditions and is a pioneer species that repopulates the margins of forests or clearcuts.

It grows slowly and does not usually fully mature due to cutting or fire. It can live 500 years, but usually does not reach 100.

Ilex aquifolium is the species of holly long associated with Christmas, and previously the Roman festival of Saturnalia. Its glossy green prickly leaves and bright red berries (produced only by the female plant) are represented in wreaths, garlands and cards wherever Christmas is celebrated. It is a subject of music and folklore, especially in the British tradition. It is also a popular ornamental shrub or hedge, with numerous cultivars in a range of colours.

Description

The leaves are 5–12 cm long and 2–6 cm broad; they are evergreen, lasting about five years, and are dark green on the upper surface and lighter on the underside, oval, leathery, shiny, and about 5 to 9 cm long. In the young and in the lower limbs of mature trees, the leaves have three to five sharp spines on each side, pointing alternately upward and downward, while leaves of the upper branches in mature trees lack spines.

The flowers are white, four-lobed, and pollinated by bees. Holly is dioecious, meaning that there are male plants and female plants. The sex cannot be determined until the plants begin flowering, usually between 4 and 12 years of age. In male specimens, the flowers are yellowish and appear in axillary groups. In the female, flowers are isolated or in groups of three and are small and white or slightly pink, and consist of four petals and four sepals partially fused at the base.

The fruit only appears on female plants, which require male plants nearby to fertilise them. The fruit is a drupe (stone fruit), about 6–10 mm in diameter, a bright red or bright yellow, which matures around October or November; at this time they are very bitter due to the ilicin content and so are rarely eaten until late winter after frost has made them softer and more palatable. They are eaten by rodents, birds and larger herbivores. Each fruit contains 3 to 4 seeds which do not germinate until the second or third spring.

Distribution
Today, holly is found in western Asia and Europe in the undergrowth of oak forest and beech forest in particular, although at times it can form a dense thicket as the dominant species. It requires moist, shady environments, found within forests or in shady slopes, cliffs, and mountain gorges.

Along the west coast of the United States and Canada, from California to British Columbia, non-native English Holly has proved very invasive, quickly spreading into native forest habitat, where it thrives in shade and crowds out native species. It has been placed on the Washington State Noxious Weed Control Board's monitor list, and is a Class C invasive plant in Portland.

During the Cenozoic Era, the Mediterranean region, Europe, and northwest Africa had a wetter climate and were largely covered by laurel forests. Holly was a typical representative species of this biome, where many current species of the genus Ilex were present. With the drying of the Mediterranean Basin during the Pliocene, the laurel forests gradually retreated, replaced by more drought-tolerant sclerophyll plant communities. The modern Ilex aquifolium resulted from this change. Most of the last remaining laurel forests around the Mediterranean are believed to have died out approximately 10,000 years ago at the end of the Pleistocene.

Ecology
Holly is a rugged pioneer species that prefers relatively moist areas, and tolerates frost as well as summer drought. The plant is common in the garrigue and maquis and is also found in deciduous forest and oak forest.

Pure stands of hollies can grow into a labyrinth of vaults in which thrushes and deer take refuge, while smaller birds are protected among their spiny leaves. After the first frost of the season, holly fruits become soft and fall to the ground serving as important food for winter birds at a time of scarce resources.

The flowers are attractive as nectar sources for insects such as bees, wasps, flies, and small butterflies. The commonly-encountered pale patches on leaves are due to the leaf-mine insect Phytomyza ilicis.

It is an invasive species on the West Coast of Canada and the United States as well as in Hawaii.

Cultivation

Ilex aquifolium is widely grown in parks and gardens in temperate regions. Hollies are often used for hedges; the spiny leaves make them difficult to penetrate, and they take well to pruning and shaping.

AGM cultivars
Numerous cultivars have been selected, of which the following have gained the Royal Horticultural Society's Award of Garden Merit:- 

I. aquifolium
'Amber' (female)
'Argentea Marginata'
'Ferox Argentea'
'Golden Queen'
'Handsworth New Silver' 
'J.C. van Tol' 
'Madame Briot' 

'Pyramidalis' 
'Silver Queen'

Ilex × altaclerensis
The hybrid Ilex × altaclerensis was developed at Highclere Castle in Hampshire, England, in 1835, a cross between I. aquifolium and the tender species I. perado. The following cultivars have gained the RHS AGM:-

'Belgica Aurea' 
'Camelliifolia' 
'Golden King' 
'Lawsoniana'

Chemistry, toxicity, tea and traditional uses
Holly berries contain alkaloids, caffeine, theobromine, saponins, caffeic acid, and a yellow pigment, ilixanthin. The berries are generally regarded as toxic to humans. Accidental consumption may occur by children or pets attracted to the bright red berries. The berries are emetic, possibly due to the compound ilicin. Caffeine and theobromine found in the plant are generally toxic to dogs and cats. The leaves of yerba mate, also in the genus Ilex, are used to make a caffeinated beverage called mate or Paraguayan tea.

In traditional medicine, holly is supposed to be diuretic, a relief from fever, and a laxative.

Other uses
Between the thirteenth and eighteenth centuries, before the introduction of turnips, Ilex aquifolium was cultivated for use as winter fodder for cattle and sheep. Less spiny varieties of holly were preferred, and in practice the leaves growing near the top of the tree have far fewer spines, making them more suitable for fodder.

Ilex aquifolium was once among the traditional woods for Great Highland bagpipes before tastes turned to imported dense tropical woods such as cocuswood, ebony, and African blackwood.

References

External links
Ilex aquifolium - information, genetic conservation units and related resources. European Forest Genetic Resources Programme (EUFORGEN)

aquifolium
Trees of Africa
Trees of Asia
Trees of Europe
Trees of mild maritime climate
Medicinal plants of Africa
Medicinal plants of Asia
Medicinal plants of Europe
Bird food plants
Garden plants of Asia
Garden plants of Europe
Ornamental trees
Plants described in 1753
Taxa named by Carl Linnaeus